Corte is a commune in the Haute-Corse department, on the island of Corsica, France.

It is the fourth-largest commune in Corsica after Ajaccio, Bastia, and Porto-Vecchio.

Administration
Corte is a subprefecture of the Haute-Corse department.

History
Corte was the capital of the Corsican independent state during the period of Pasquale Paoli.

During World War I, German prisoners of war were kept in the Citadel.

Population

Sights
Sites of interest include the Fortress (A citadella), the Museum of Corsica (Museu di a Corsica), and the University of Corsica (Università di Corsica).

Pieve Santa Mariona di Tàlcini, a ruined medieval pieve (church)

Transport
National roads lead to Ajaccio and Bastia.

Corte is also linked to Ajaccio, Bastia and Calvi by the Chemin de fer de la Corse (Corsican Railway), and is served by trains running between Ajaccio and Calvi, and Ajaccio and Bastia.

Climate 

Corte has a hot-summer mediterranean climate (Köppen climate classification: Csa), sometimes presenting alpine conditions during the winter, with 52 summer days and 56 frost days.

Education
Corte has become a major university town in Corsica since the Pasquale Paoli University opened up again in 1980s.

Notable people
Corte was the birthplace of Joseph Bonaparte (1768–1844), the eldest brother of the French Emperor Napoleon I, who made him King of Naples (1806–1808) and Spain (1808–1813).
Corte was also the birthplace of Theophilus of Corte (1676 - 1740), an Italian Roman Catholic priest and a professed member from the Order of Friars Minor.

Gallery

See also
Communes of the Haute-Corse department

References

External links

 Official website 
 Tourist office website 
 University of Corsica 

 
Communes of Haute-Corse
Subprefectures in France
Capitals of former nations
Haute-Corse communes articles needing translation from French Wikipedia